The Helena Lewin Chair in Latin American Studies (HLCLAS) was established by the University of Haifa in the mid-1990s. It works to study issues belonging to political, social, environmental, and indigenous themes and areas in Latin America. By initiating a number of international projects, education programs and conferences, the chair aims to develop public awareness over these present and past issues. The current chairperson is Amos Megged.

Overview
In 2002, the Helena Lewin Chair in Latin American Studies (HLCLAS) initiated an international symposium that dealt with human rights and impunity in Latin America, from the legal angle in which leading jurists from Latin America and Spain participated.

The following symposium, in 2010, dealt with the Amazon Forest and the human repercussions of its exploitation.

In 2010, the HLCLAS inaugurated a multi-disciplinary electronic journal, the Latinam-Zine. It focuses on ecological, environmental, anthropological and ethnohistorical issues, related to the indigenous populations in Latin-America. Its first issue is entitled Globalization in the Amazon: Exploiting Natural Resources and the Sustainability of the Human Factor.

In 2010/2011 the Chair inaugurated the "Latin American Ambassadors' Forum", a round of lectures held throughout the year, in which  ambassadors accredited to Israel present and discuss the positions of his/her country on issues related to current economic, social and political transformations. It also aims to promote dialogues and discussions between diplomats from Latin America in Israel on foreign policy.

For the past years, the HLCLAS has promoted a Latin American Studies program, based on existing courses as well as on newly created courses for PhD, MA and BA.

References

External links
 
Federico Lotfe, Ambassador of Mexico, speaking at the Ambassadors Forum
Prof. Helena Lewin's CV

1990s establishments in Israel
University of Haifa
Latin American studies